Brookside is a census-designated place (CDP) in New Castle County, Delaware, United States. The population was 14,353 at the 2010 census.

Geography
Brookside is located at  (39.6670561, -75.7268779).

Demographics

At the 2000 census, there were 14,806 people, 5,465 households and 3,858 families living in the CDP. The racial makeup of the CDP was 77.35% White, 15.03% African American, 0.32% Native American, 2.61% Asian, 0.07% Pacific Islander, 2.22% from other races, and 2.40% from two or more races. Hispanic or Latino of any race were 5.59% of the population.

There were 5,465 households, of which 35.9% had children under the age of 18 living with them, 49.9% were married couples living together, 15.4% had a female householder with no husband present, and 29.4% were non-families. 22.1% of all households were made up of individuals, and 6.8% had someone living alone who was 65 years of age or older. The average household size was 2.68 and the average family size was 3.15.

Age distribution was 26.8% under the age of 18, 9.6% from 18 to 24, 33.2% from 25 to 44, 20.5% from 45 to 64, and 9.9% who were 65 years of age or older. The median age was 34 years. For every 100 females, there were 96.3 males. For every 100 females age 18 and over, there were 91.9 males.

The median household income was $50,107, and the median family income was $55,077. Males had a median income of $37,040 versus $29,494 for females. The per capita income for the CDP was $19,527. About 5.6% of families and 7.4% of the population were below the poverty line, including 9.4% of those under age 18 and 9.0% of those age 65 or over.

Education
Christina School District operates area district public schools.

Zoned elementary schools serving Brookside include Brookside Elementary School and Jennie E. Smith Elementary School. Brookside is divided between the boundaries of Gauger/Cobbs Middle School, Kirk Middle School, and Shue-Medill Middle School. Brookside is divided between the zones of Christiana High School and Newark High School.

Previously Grades 5-6 were assigned to schools in Wilmington: Bayard and Stubbs.

Delaware School for the Deaf is in Brookside.

References

Census-designated places in New Castle County, Delaware
Census-designated places in Delaware